Lieutenant-Colonel Thomas Howard, 3rd Earl of Effingham, PC (13 January 1746 – 19 November 1791), styled Lord Howard until 1763, was a British nobleman and Army officer, the son of Thomas Howard, 2nd Earl of Effingham, and his wife Elizabeth.

Lord Howard was commissioned an ensign and lieutenant in the 2nd Regiment of Foot Guards on 20 February 1762. He was promoted to captain in the 5th Regiment of Foot on 13 September 1765.

He is best known for resigning his commission in protest against the war against the North American colonies. This widely reported act was commemorated by the North American colonists in the naming of a galley in 1775, and later the frigate USS Effingham in 1777, as well as in the naming of Effingham, New Hampshire, Effingham County, Georgia, and Effingham County, Illinois.

In 1770 at the age of 24, he fought as a volunteer in the Russian army during the Russo-Turkish War and was present at the destruction of the Turkish fleet at Chesma Bay.

In 1775 upon learning that his regiment would be imminently deployed to North America he wrote to the Secretary of State for War Lord Barrington to resign his commission. Giving his reasoning in his letter to Barrington, Howard stated; "As I cannot, without reproach from my conscience, consent to bear arms against my fellow subjects in America in what, to my weak discernment, is not a clear cause."

In a speech to the House of Lords explaining his resignation, Howard symbolically drew his officer's sword and threw it onto the floor of the chamber.

During the events leading up to the American Revolution, the Earl had taken up a position of neutrality. The Earl disliked both sides: the British Government for its coercive policies and implementation of taxation, and the colonists for engaging in armed rebellion. Howard however believed that the conflict would have a negative impact on both Great Britain and America. Despite resigning his commission he professed devotion to the army and to King and country, and claimed that he was willing to lose his life while protecting the realm from attack.

In spite of his public resignation and denunciation of the government, Howard was permitted to return to the army at the time of the threatened invasion and was promoted to Lieutenant-Colonel in 1782.

In 1785, a London newspaper reported that he was being considered for the role of minister to the United States, to reciprocate John Adams coming to Great Britain to serve as Ambassador. However, he did not go to America; George Hammond later served as the first envoy to America.

He died at the age of 45, while serving as Governor of Jamaica, a month and five days after his wife, leaving no heir. His title passed to his brother Richard.

References

External links
 Earl of Effingham

1746 births
1791 deaths
18th-century British Army personnel
British expatriates in Jamaica
Cheshire Regiment officers
Earls in the Peerage of Great Britain
Thomas
Members of the Privy Council of Great Britain
Treasurers of the Household
Royal Northumberland Fusiliers officers
Coldstream Guards officers
Earls of Effingham
Barons Howard of Effingham